This is a list of British television related events from 1962.

Events

January
2 January – Z-Cars premieres on BBC TV, noted as a realistic portrayal of the police. Unusually for its time, the series is set in Northern England, most BBC dramas have been set in Southern England.
4 January – ITV Anglia region starts showing the US science fiction horror anthology series The Twilight Zone over a year before other ITV regions.

February
No events.

March
No events.

April
13 April – The Johnny Morris presented children's series Animal Magic debuts on BBC TV.
17 April – Brothers in Law premieres on BBC TV.

May
16 May – BBC1 debuts the US cartoon series Top Cat, however a few weeks later the BBC change the title to "Boss Cat" to avoid similarities with a popular cat food brand of the same name.

June
14 June – BBC television broadcasts the first episode of the sitcom Steptoe and Son, written by Galton and Simpson and starring Wilfrid Brambell and Harry H. Corbett.

July
1 July – Police 5 premieres on ITV.
11 July – Live television broadcast from the USA to Britain for the first time, via the Telstar satellite and Goonhilly Satellite Earth Station.
23 July – First live public transatlantic television broadcast, via satellite Telstar.

August
No events.

September
1 September – Channel Television, the ITV franchise for the Channel Islands, goes on air.
14 September – Wales West and North Television (Teledu Cymru) goes on air to the North and West Wales region, extending ITV to the whole of the UK.
21 September – First broadcast of the long-running television quiz programme University Challenge, made by Granada Television with Bamber Gascoigne as quizmaster.
22 September – Anglia Television launches Match of the Week which shows highlights of football matches from around East Anglia. Shortly after, Tyne Tees Television in the North East of England begins broadcasting local matches under the title Shoot.

October
4 October – The Saint premieres on ITV with Roger Moore in the title role.
17 October – Veteran Irish broadcaster Gay Byrne becomes the first person to introduce The Beatles on television as the band makes its small screen debut on Granada Television's local news programme People and Places.
21 October – American Folk Blues Festival in Manchester is filmed and shown in two parts of ITV's arts series Tempo.

November
24 November – The first episode of influential satire show That Was The Week That Was is broadcast on BBC Television.

December
No events.

Unknown
Cigarette adverts are banned from children's programmes in the UK. Actors in these adverts now have to be over 21 and connection to social success is no longer allowed. The tobacco companies also start a policy of not advertising before 9pm.

Debuts

BBC Television Service/BBC TV
2 January 
Z-Cars (1962–1978)
Compact (1962–1965)
7 January – Oliver Twist (1962)
8 January – Crying Down the Lane (1962)
22 January – Studio 4 (1962)
2 February – Corrigan Blake (1962–1963)
19 February – Barbara in Black (1962)
10 March – The Six Proud Walkers (1962)
8 April – Stranger in the City (1962)
13 April – Animal Magic (1962–1983)
14 April – Mr. Pastry's Progress (1962)
17 April – Brothers in Law (1962)
30 April – Suspense (1962–1963)
16 May – Boss Cat (UK title of US Top Cat; 1961–1962)
21 May – The Franchise Affair (1962)
26 May – William (1962–1963)
27 May – The Master of Ballantrae (1962)
9 June – The Big Pull (1962)
14 June – Steptoe and Son (1962–1965, 1970, 1972–1974)
22 June – Climate of Fear (1962)
28 June – The Andromeda Breakthrough (1962)
8 July – The Dark Island (1962)
17 July – Hugh and I (1962–1968)
21 July – Outbreak of Murder (1962)
7 August – Silent Evidence (1962)
16 August – Dr. Finlay's Casebook (1962–1971)
16 August – Katy (1962)
12 September – Dial RIX (1962–1963)
17 September – Wales Today (1962–present)
3 October – Zero One (1962–1963)
6 October – The Last Man Out (1962)
14 October – The River Flows East (1962)
 14 October – Raise Your Glasses (1962)
8 November – The Monsters (1962)
12 November – Top of the Form (1962–1975)
24 November – That Was The Week That Was (1962–1963)
6 December – The Largest Theatre in the World (1962; 1965; 1967; 1970–1971)

ITV
4 January – The Twilight Zone (1959-1964)
10 January – Take a Letter (1962–1964)
27 February – Sara and Hoppity (1962–1963)
4 June – Richard the Lionheart (1962–1963)
30 June – Out of This World (1962)
1 July – Police 5 (1962–1992)
19 September – Bulldog Breed  (1962)
21 September – University Challenge (1962–1987 ITV, 1994–present BBC)
29 September – 
On the Braden Beat (1962–1967)
Man of the World (1962–1963)
Strange Concealments (1962)
The Sword in the Web (1962)
4 October – The Saint (1962–1969)
11 October – It's a Living (1962)
26 October – Francie and Josie (1962–1965)
28 October
Fireball XL5 (1962–1973)
The New Adventures of Madeline (1962–1969)
17 November – City Beneath the Sea (1962)
28 November – Electra (1962)
20 December – It Happened Like This (1962–1963)
25 December – The Yogi Bear Show (1961–1962)

Continuing television shows

1920s
BBC Wimbledon (1927–1939, 1946–2019, 2021–2024)

1930s
The Boat Race (1938–1939, 1946–2019)
BBC Cricket (1939, 1946–1999, 2020–2024)

1940s
Come Dancing (1949–1998)

1950s
Andy Pandy (1950–1970, 2002–2005)
Watch with Mother (1952–1975) 
Rag, Tag and Bobtail (1953–1965)
The Good Old Days (1953–1983)
Panorama (1953–present)
Picture Book (1955–1965)
Sunday Night at the London Palladium (1955–1967, 1973–1974)
Take Your Pick! (1955–1968, 1992–1998)
Double Your Money (1955–1968)
Dixon of Dock Green (1955–1976)
Crackerjack (1955–1984, 2020–present)
Opportunity Knocks (1956–1978, 1987–1990)
This Week (1956–1978, 1986–1992)
Armchair Theatre (1956–1974)
What the Papers Say (1956–2008)
The Sky at Night (1957–present)
Blue Peter (1958–present)
Grandstand (1958–2007)
Noggin the Nog (1959–1965, 1970, 1979–1982)

1960s
Sykes and A... (1960–1965)
The Flintstones (1960–1966)
Coronation Street (1960–present)
Points of View (1961–present)
Songs of Praise (1961–present)
Ghost Squad (1961–1964)
The Avengers (1961–1969)

Ending this year
 Railway Roundabout (1958–1962)
 Face to Face (1959–1962)
 Mess Mates (1960–1962)
 Sir Francis Drake (1961–1962)
 Supercar (1961–1962)
 Top Cat (1961–1962)
 Winning Widows (1961–1962)

Births
25 January – Emma Freud, English broadcaster and cultural commentator
7 February – Eddie Izzard, British actor and comedian
13 February – Hugh Dennis, British actor, comedian and writer (The Now Show)
21 February – Vanessa Feltz, British television presenter
17 March – Clare Grogan, Scottish actress and singer
1 April – Phillip Schofield, British TV presenter
23 April – John Hannah, Scottish actor
17 May
Craig Ferguson, Scottish actor and television presenter
Alan Johnston, journalist
6 June – Sarah Parkinson, producer and writer of radio and television programmes (died 2003)
15 June – Chris Morris, satirist and actor
19 June – Lisa Aziz, journalist and newsreader
25 June – Phill Jupitus, comedian and broadcaster
29 June – Amanda Donohoe, English actress
4 July – Neil Morrissey, English actor
24 July – Cleo Rocos, British actress (The Kenny Everett Show)
20 August – Sophie Aldred, British actress and television presenter
5 September – Peter Wingfield, Welsh actor
8 September – Daljit Dhaliwal, British newsreader and television presenter
15 September – Steve Punt, British actor, comedian and writer (The Now Show)
17 September – Michael French, actor
21 September – Nick Knowles, television presenter
24 September – Ally McCoist, Scottish footballer and TV pundit and A Question of Sport team captain
5 October – Caron Keating, British TV presenter (died 2004)
20 October – Boothby Graffoe, English comedian, singer, songwriter and playwright
25 October – Nick Hancock, British actor and television presenter
26 October – Cary Elwes, British actor
12 November – Mariella Frostrup, British journalist and television presenter
26 November – Louise Harrison, actress and producer
3 December – Sarah Jarvis, General Practitioner and media personality
6 December – Colin Salmon, British actor
28 December – Kaye Adams, Scottish television presenter
Unknown 
Carrie Gracie, journalist and newsreader
Kazia Pelka, actress
Matthew Amroliwala, newsreader
Jack Docherty, Scottish comedian
Mat Fraser, actor, musician and performing artist

See also
 1962 in British music
 1962 in British radio
 1962 in the United Kingdom
 List of British films of 1962

References